An anticyclonic tornado is a tornado which rotates in a clockwise direction in the Northern Hemisphere and a counterclockwise direction in the Southern Hemisphere. The term is a naming convention denoting the anomaly from normal rotation which is cyclonic in upwards of 98 percent of tornadoes. Many anticyclonic tornadoes are smaller and weaker than cyclonic tornadoes, forming from a different process, as either companion/satellite tornadoes or nonmesocyclonic tornadoes.

Formation
Most strong tornadoes form in the inflow and updraft area bordering the updraft-downdraft interface (which is also near the mesoscale "triple point") zone of supercell thunderstorms. The thunderstorm itself is rotating, with a rotating updraft known as a mesocyclone, and then a smaller area of rotation at lower altitude the tornadocyclone (or low-level mesocyclone) which produces or enables the smaller rotation that is a tornado. All of these may be quasi-vertically aligned continuing from the ground to the mid-upper levels of the storm. All of these cyclones and scaling all the way up to large extratropical (low-pressure systems) and tropical cyclones rotate cyclonically. Rotation in these synoptic scale systems stems partly from the Coriolis effect, but thunderstorms and tornadoes are too small to be significantly affected. The common property here is an area of lower pressure, thus surrounding air flows into the area of less dense air forming cyclonic rotation. The rotation of the thunderstorm itself is induced mostly by vertical wind shear, specifically clockwise turning as altitude increases (called a veered vertical profile, although backed profiles can occur with anticyclonic supercells).

Various processes can produce an anticyclonic tornado. Most often they are satellite tornadoes of larger tornadoes which are directly associated with the tornadocyclone and mesocyclone. Occasionally anticyclonic tornadoes occur as an anticyclonic companion (mesoanticyclone) to a mesocyclone within a single storm. Anticyclonic tornadoes can occur as the primary tornado with a mesocyclone and under a rotating wall cloud. Also, anticyclonic supercells (with mesoanticyclone), which usually are storms that split and move to the left of the parent storm motion, though very rarely spawning tornadoes, spawn anticyclonic tornadoes. There is an increased incidence of anticyclonic tornadoes associated with tropical cyclones, and mesovortices within bow echoes may spawn anticyclonic tornadoes.

The first anticyclonic tornado associated with a mesoanticyclone was spotted on WSR-88D weather radar in Sunnyvale, California on May 4, 1998. The tornado was an F2 on the Fujita Scale.

Known "anticyclonic tornado" events

See also 

 Vortex
 Vorticity
 Pressure-gradient force (PGF)
 Rossby number
 Anticyclonic storm

References

External links 
 Tornadic Meso-anticyclonic supercell in Sunnyvale California (NSSL)

Anticyclones
Tornado
Tornadogenesis

fr:Tornade#Tornade anticyclonique